It Might as Well Be Swing is a 1964 studio album by Frank Sinatra, accompanied by Count Basie and his orchestra. It was Sinatra's first studio recording arranged by Quincy Jones.

The recording of "Fly Me to the Moon" which appears on this album has become one of Sinatra's most popular. This was Sinatra and Basie's second collaboration after 1962's Sinatra-Basie.

Sinatra's cover version of "Hello Dolly" on the album features a new second verse improvised by Sinatra, which pays tribute to Louis Armstrong, who had topped the Billboard charts with his own version of the song earlier in 1964.

It Might as Well Be Swing is a reference to the title of the well known jazz standard "It Might as Well Be Spring".

Track listing

Personnel
 Frank Sinatra - vocals
 Count Basie - piano
 Quincy Jones - arranger, conductor
The Count Basie Orchestra
Al Porcino, Don Rader, Wallace Davenport, Al Aarons, George Cohn and Harry "Sweets" Edison - trumpets
Henry Coker, Grover Mitchell, Bill Hughes, Henderson Chambers and Kenny Shroyer - trombones
 Frank Foster, Charles Fowlkes, Marshal Royal, Frank Wess and Eric Dixon - reeds
Emil Richards - vibraphone
George Catlett - double bass
 Freddie Green - guitar
 Sonny Payne - drums
String section
Gerald Vinci, Israel Baker, Jacques Gasselin, Thelma Beach, Bonnie Douglas, Marshall Sosson, Erno Neufeld, Lou Raderman, Paul Shure and James Getzoff - violins
Virginia Majewski, Paul Robyn, Alvin Dinkin and Stan Harris - violas
 Edgar Lustgarten and Ann Goodman - cellos
Production
 Sonny Burke - producer
Lowell Frank - engineer
 Ted Allen - cover photo
Gregg Geller - 1998 reissue producer
Lee Herschberg - 20-bit digital mastering

References

1964 albums
Albums arranged by Quincy Jones
Albums conducted by Quincy Jones
Albums produced by Sonny Burke
Collaborative albums
Count Basie Orchestra albums
Frank Sinatra albums
Reprise Records albums